This is complete list of works by American historical novelist F. Van Wyck Mason.

Bibliography

Action adventure

Short stories

 The Fetish of Sergeant M’Gourra (1928)
 Previous Rank (1928)
 This Battalion has a Curse on It (1928)
 Do It or Be Court-Martialed (1928)
 Croix de Guerre (1928)
 Brothers in Red  (1928)
 Useless (1928)
 Special Delivery (1928)
 The Trail of Mr. Solingen (1928)
 Poisoned Skies (1928)
 The Sword of Vengeance  (1928)
 The Doubting Legionnaire Terris (1929)
 Death Is Trumps (1929)
 The Sub and the Merchant Prince (1929)
 Arms and the Girl  (1929)
 Polo Par Excellence (1929)
 Sisters of the Sea (1929)
 The Jest of Caid MacGregor (1929)
 Kamerad (1929)
 The Trap-Door of Hell (1929)
 The Word of Adjutant Kent (1929)
 Africa - Uncensored (1929)
 Death's Domain  (1929)
 The Stone of Tanit-Astarte (1929)
 The Goldfish Mutiny (1929)
 Spoils of the Sargasso (1929)
 A Gentleman of Coat Armor (1930)
 Mad Anthony’s Legion  (1930)
 Reynard's Vengeance (1930)
 The Jester's Duel (1930)
 The Morale Breakers (1930)
 The Scourge of Shaitan (1930)
 Thinkinges' Buck (1930)
 Warriors of Fate (1930)
 A Job for the Tanks (1931)
 Black Orchids (1931)
 Buccaneer Trap (1931)
 Fetish Fighters  (1931)
 Ley Fuego (1931)
 Phalanxes of Atlans (1931)
 The Living Juggernaut  (1931)
 The Master of Elephants  (1931)
 The Red Ships of Death  (1931)
 The Tiger of Pnom Kha (1931)
 The Twenty Wicked People (1931)
 The Vanishing Millionaires (1931)

 Always Obey Orders (1932)
 Buffalo Hunter (1932)
 Contraband (1932)
 Desert Vengeance (1932)
 The Girl of Antelope Pass (1932)
 The Jungle Trap (1932)
 The Turquoise Rattler (1932)
 Thirty Seconds Gone (1932)
 Elephant Ju-Ju (1933)
 Emperor's Gold (1933)
 Fangs in the Dark (1933)
 The Fire Bug (1933)
 The Snaring of Sergeant Frost (1933)
 To Be Court-Martialed (1933)
 Voices from the Fog (1933)
 The Steel Legion (1934)
 West Coast Spoils (1934)
 Escape! (1935)
 Lancers, Advance! (1935)
 Mistress Headlong (1935)
 The Enemy's Goal  (1935)
 After The Alamo (1936)
 Before the Alamo  (1936)
 Black Angel Bridge  (1936)
 Hand Drums (1936)
 Special Warden (1936)
 The Broken Wall  (1936)
 The Flame Slayer (1936)
 An Enemy at the Dinner Table (1937)
 Gilolo Passage (1937)
 Isles of Doom (1937)
 Old Dog Head (1937)
 Wings over Malekula (1937)
 Midshipman Red Fox (1938)
 Twenty Fathom Terror (1938)
 Valley of the Tigers (1938)
 Pole Star City Case (1939)
 I Start Smoking (1942)
 King of the Lion Hunters (1953)
 The Dawn Hunters (1953)
 Death of a Double Agent (1954)
 Ducks or Death (1954)
 On the Plain of Shahpur (1954)
 Salt-Water Thriller (1957)

Novels

 Captain Nemesis (1931)
 Captain Judas (1931)
 Captain Renegade (1932)
 Captain Redspurs (1933)
 The Barbarian (1934)
 Captain Long Knife (1934)
 Lysander of Chios (1935)
 All Save One Shall Die (1939)
 Hang My Wreath (1941, as Ward Weaver, rewritten from Captain Redspurs)

 End Of Track (1943, as Ward Weaver, rewritten from Captain Long Knife)
 Wild Drums Beat (1953, rewritten from Captain Renegade)
 The Barbarians (1954, rewritten from The Barbarian)
 Captain Judas (1955, rewritten from 1931 version)
 Lysander (1956, rewritten from Lysander of Chios)
 Captain Nemesis (1957, rewritten from 1929 version)
 Return of the Eagles (1959, rewritten from All Save One Shall Die)

Mystery novels

 Spider House (1932)
 Murder in the Senate (1935, as Geoffrey Coffin with Helen Brawner)

 The Forgotten Fleet Mystery (1936, as Geoffrey Coffin with A.H. Young O'Brien)
 The Castle Island Case (1937)

Hugh North series

Short stories

 "Murder on Swan Island" (1934)
 "The Port of Peril" (1934, aka "The Port of Intrigue")
 "Crime of the Legion" (1934, aka "The Repeater")
 "Explosion" (1935, aka "The Munition Ship Murders")

 "Shanghai Sanctuary" (1935)
 "An Enemy at the Dinner Table" (1937)
 "The Plum Colored Corpse" (1956)

Novels

 Seeds of Murder (1930)
 The Vesper Service Murders (1931)
 Fort Terror Murders (1931)
 The Yellow Arrow Murders (1932)
 The Branded Spy Murders (1932)
 The Shanghai Bund Murders (1933)
 The Sulu Sea Murders (1933)
 The Budapest Parade Murders (1935)
 The Washington Legation Murders (1935)
 The Cairo Garter Murders (1938)
 The Hongkong Airbase Murders (1937)
 The Singapore Exile Murders (1939)
 The Bucharest Ballerina Murders (1940)

 The Rio Casino Intrigue (1941)
 Saigon Singer (1946)
 Dardanelles Derelict (1949)
 Himalayan Assignment (1952)
 Two Tickets For Tangier (1955)
 The Gracious Lily Affair (1957)
 Secret Mission to Bangkok (1960)
 Colonel Hugh North Solves The Multi-Million-Dollar Murders (1960, rewritten from The Castle Island Case)
 Trouble in Burma (1962)
 Zanzibar Intrigue (1963)
 Maracaibo Mission (1965)
 Deadly Orbit Mission (1968)

Anthologies

 The Seven Seas Murders (1936)
 Captain North's Three Biggest Cases (1936)
 Military Intelligence - 8 (1941)

 Oriental Division G-2 (1942)
 The Man from G-2 (1943)

Historical fiction

Novels

 Three Harbours (1938)
 Stars on the Sea (1940)
 Rivers of Glory (1942)
 Eagle in the Sky (1948)
 Cutlass Empire (1949)
 Proud New Flags (1951)
 Golden Admiral (1953)
 Blue Hurricane (1954)
 Silver Leopard (1955)
 Our Valiant Few (1956)
 The Young Titan (1959)

 Manila Galleon  (1961)
 The Sea 'Venture (1961)
 Rascals' Heaven (1964)
 Wild Horizon (1966)
 Harpoon in Eden (1969)
 Brimstone Club (1971)
 Log Cabin Noble (1973)
 Trumpets Sound No More (1975)
 Guns for Rebellion (1977)
 Armored Giants (1980)

Anthologies
 Roads to Liberty (1968)

Young adult

 Q-Boat (1943, as Frank W. Mason)
 Pilots, Man Your Planes (1944, as Frank W. Mason)
 Flight Into Danger (1946, as Frank W. Mason)
 Valley Forge: 24 December 1777 (1950)
 The Winter at Valley Forge (1953)

 The Battle of Lake Erie (1960)
 The Battles for New Orleans (1962)
 The Battle for Quebec (1965)
 The Maryland Colony (1969)

Edited by

 The Fighting American (1943, editor)

 American Men at Arms (1964, editor)

References

Bibliographies by writer
Bibliographies of American writers
Bibliographies of historical novels